The Austrian Bishops' Conference is the official assembly of the Roman Catholic bishops of Austria. It is the supreme authority of the Roman Catholic Church in Austria, established as a formal body under public law in 1849. Its members include the archbishops of Vienna and Salzburg, all diocesan and auxiliary bishops, as well as the abbot of immediate  Wettingen-Mehrerau Abbey. 

The Episcopal Conference represents the Catholic Church towards the Austrian Federal Government in all matters of legal relationships between church and state and freedom of religion. It is also the supreme ecclesiastical authority in Austria concerning Catholic canon law. The assembly is a member of the Council of the Bishops' Conferences of Europe (CCEE) and of the Commission of the Bishops' Conferences of the European Community. It also runs the official Catholic news agency Kathpress. 

The current chairman of the Bishop's Conference is Franz Lackner, the Archbishop of Salzburg.

Legal bases
The Conference functions in accordance with the Documents of the Second Vatican Council, in particular the Christus Dominus Decree on the Pastoral Office of Bishops (37/38), the 1983 Code of Canon Law (Cann. 447–459), and its own constitutions. Its legal position as a formal corporation under public law and representative body of a state-recognised religious community was confirmed by a 1933 concordat between the Holy See and the First Austrian Republic.

Active Members

Conference Leadership
 Franz Lackner O.F.M., Archbishop of Salzburg (Chairman)
 Manfred Scheuer, Bishop of Linz (Deputy Chairman)

Members
 Cardinal Christoph Schönborn O.P., Archbishop of Vienna
 Alois Schwarz, Bishop of Sankt Pölten
 Werner Freistetter,  Military Ordinary of Austria
 Josef Marketz, Bishop of Gurk
 Benno Elbs, Bishop of Feldkirch
 Wilhelm Krautwaschl, Bishop of Graz-Seckau
 Aegidius Zsifkovics, Bishop of Eisenstadt
 Hermann Glettler, Bishop of Innsbruck
 Franz Scharl, Auxiliary Bishop of Vienna
 Stephan Turnovszky, Auxiliary Bishop of Vienna
 Hansjörg Hofer, Auxiliary Bishop of Salzburg
 Anton Leichtfried, Auxiliary Bishop of Sankt Pölten
 Vinzenz Wohlwend, O.Cist., Abbot of Wettingen-Mehrerau Abbey

Chairmen
 Cardinal Theodor Innitzer (1933–1955), Archbishop of Vienna
 Archbishop Andreas Rohracher (1955–1959), Archbishop of Salzburg
 Cardinal Franz König (1959–1985), Archbishop of Vienna
 Archbishop Karl Berg, (1985–1989), Archbishop of Salzburg
 Cardinal Hans Hermann Groer, O.S.B. (1989–1995), Archbishop of Vienna
 Bishop Johann Weber (1995–1998), Bishop of Graz–Seckau
 Cardinal Christoph Schönborn O.P. (1998–2020), Archbishop of Vienna
 Archbishop Franz Lackner O.F.M. (2020–present), Archbishop of Salzburg

See also
Catholic Church in Austria

References

External links

Austria
Catholic Church in Austria
Christian organizations established in 1933